Cyperus noeanus is a species of sedge that is native to parts of Turkey.

See also 
 List of Cyperus species

References 

noeanus
Plants described in 1882
Flora of Turkey